Demnitz is a small river of Brandenburg, Germany. It flows into the Oelsener See, which is drained by the Oelse, near Grunow-Dammendorf.

See also
List of rivers of Brandenburg

Rivers of Brandenburg
Rivers of Germany